Daniel Wolf (born 4 May 1985 in Vienna) is an Austrian association footballer who currently plays for SC Ritzing.

External links
Daniel Wolf at ÖFB

1985 births
Living people
Austrian footballers
Austrian expatriate footballers
Austria under-21 international footballers
Association football midfielders
Footballers from Vienna
FC Admira Wacker Mödling players
LASK players
U.S. Pistoiese 1921 players
Piacenza Calcio 1919 players
SC Wiener Neustadt players
TSV Hartberg players
SC Austria Lustenau players
FC Mauerwerk players
Austrian Football Bundesliga players
Serie B players
Austrian expatriate sportspeople in Italy
Expatriate footballers in Italy